Celtis hypoleuca is a species of plant in the family Cannabaceae. It is endemic to New Caledonia.

References

Endemic flora of New Caledonia
hypoleuca
Endangered plants
Taxonomy articles created by Polbot
Taxa named by Jules Émile Planchon